Smøla is a municipality in Møre og Romsdal county, Norway. It is part of the Nordmøre region. The administrative centre of the municipality is the village of Hopen, other villages include Dyrnes, Råket, and Veiholmen.

The  municipality is the 272nd largest by area out of the 356 municipalities in Norway. Smøla is the 273rd most populous municipality in Norway with a population of 2,120.

General information

The municipality of Smøla was established on 1 January 1960 after the merger of the municipalities of Edøy (population: 1,135), Brattvær (population: 1,361), and Hopen (population: 1,550). The initial population of Smøla was 4,046. The boundaries have not changed since that time.

Name
The municipality is named after the main island of Smøla ( or ). The name is probably related to the modern Norwegian words smule and smuldre which means "crumble", referring to the thousands of small islands and islets around the main island. Researchers at the Technical University of Berlin have claimed that Smøla is the island which Pytheas called Thule (Thoúlē).

Coat of arms
The coat of arms was granted in 1989. The arms show two white seagulls on a red background. This design was chosen to highlight the fact that this is an island community and that is a common type of bird in the area.

Churches
The Church of Norway has three parishes within the municipality of Smøla. It is part of the Ytre Nordmøre prosti (deanery) in the Diocese of Møre.

In 2019, archaeologists from the Norwegian Institute for Cultural Heritage Research using large-scale high-resolution georadar technology, determined that a 17 meter long Viking ship was buried on the island of Edøya near one of the churches. They estimate its age as over 1,000 years, from the Merovingian or Viking period; the group hopes to conduct additional searches in the area. A similar burial was found previously by the group, in Gjellestad.

Geography

The municipality of Smøla is located north of the town of Kristiansund, off the western coast of Norway. The municipality consists of the main island of Smøla and more than 3,000 smaller ones. Almost all of the land area consists of marshes and cliffs; only 5% is cultivated into agricultural land. Other minor islands in the municipality include Edøya, Kuli, and Veiholmen. The municipality is separated from the rest of Norway by the Edøyfjorden to the south.

Due to the vast number of small islands surrounding Smøla, there are several lighthouses. The three most notable ones are Haugjegla Lighthouse (north of Smøla), Skalmen Lighthouse, (northwest of Smøla), and Tyrhaug Lighthouse (southeast of Smøla in the Edøyfjorden).

Scientists of the Institute of Geodesy and Geoinformationtechnique of the Technical University of Berlin were testing the antique maps of Ptolemy and recognized a pattern of calculation mistakes that occurred when one tried to convert the old coordinates from Ptolemy into modern cartographical maps. The scientists believe that, when one compensates for these mistakes, the mythological location Thule corresponds to the island of Smøla.

Climate
Smøla has a temperate oceanic climate, also known as a marine west coast climate (Cfb), with a cool summer and mild winter. The year amplitude is only  from the coldest to the warmest month. The driest season is from April - July, and the wettest season is autumn and winter. The record high is from July 2018, and the record low is from February 2010.

Government
All municipalities in Norway, including Smøla, are responsible for primary education (through 10th grade), outpatient health services, senior citizen services, unemployment and other social services, zoning, economic development, and municipal roads. The municipality is governed by a municipal council of elected representatives, which in turn elect a mayor.  The municipality falls under the Møre og Romsdal District Court and the Frostating Court of Appeal.

Municipal council
The municipal council of Smøla is made up of 17 representatives that are elected to four year terms. The party breakdown of the council is as follows:

Mayor
The mayors of Smøla (incomplete list):
2019–present: Svein Roksvåg (Sp)
2011-2019: Roger Osen (Ap)
1991-2011: Iver G. Nordseth (V)
1988-1991: Joralf Flataukan (H)
1985-1987: Hans Vallestad (H)
1980-1985: Gudmund Restad (Sp)

Media
The newspaper Nordvestnytt has been published in Smøla since 1988.

Energy

Phase two was opened in September 2005 and included forty-eight 2.3-MW wind turbines. All in all, the wind energy production project consists of 68 windmills, making it among the largest wind projects in Europe. The total generating capacity is equivalent to 450 GWh of electricity per year, which corresponds to the average annual power consumption of 22,500 Norwegian households.

Attractions

Veiholmen is a large fishing village, north of the main island.
Kulisteinen (the Kuli stone), probably one of the best remains which tells about early Christianity in Norway. On one side it has a large cross, which was well known for a long time. Less well known was a runic inscription on the rim of the stone.
Old Edøy Church, a restored church dating back to about the year 1190.
Deep-sea fishing is a part of the natural environment of Smøla. Smøla provides facilities, guided fishing trips and possibilities for renting fisherman's boats and needed equipment. Participants can expect to catch a large selection of deep sea fish in this area: herring, cod, redfish, perch, monkfish, Atlantic halibut, plaice, carp, char, mackerel, and others.

Notable people 
 Oluf Skarpnes (1932 in Smøla - 2019) a Norwegian jurist and public servant
 Kåre Bryn (born 1944 in Smøla) a Norwegian diplomat 
 Ingar Knudtsen (born 1944 in Smøla) a Norwegian novelist and poet
 Marianne Schröder (born 1977 in Smøla) a Norwegian model

References

External links

Municipal fact sheet from Statistics Norway 
Official website 
Statkraft
Veiholmen.com 

 
Nordmøre
Municipalities of Møre og Romsdal
1960 establishments in Norway